Atrachelus cinereus is a species of assassin bug in the family Reduviidae. It is found in Central America, North America, and South America.

Subspecies
 Atrachelus cinereus cinereus (Fabricius, 1798)
 Atrachelus cinereus wygodzinskyi
 Atrachelus cinereus wygoszinskyi Elkins, 1954

References

Further reading

 
 
 
 
 
 
 
 
 

Reduviidae
Insects described in 1798